Seeb is a city in Oman.

Seeb or SEEB may also refer to:

 Al-Seeb Club, an Omani football club
 Al-Seeb Stadium, a sports stadium
 Seeb (music producers), a Norwegian EDM production duo
 Seeb International Airport, former name of Muscat International Airport
 Seeb Palace, a royal palace
 Semiempirical Energy Based, a partition method

See also
 SIB (disambiguation)